Lars Van Ryckeghem (born 18 September 2002) is a Belgian racing cyclist. Lars currently rides for the Lotto–Soudal U23, and previously rode for the CT Luc Wallays club in Belgium as a junior.

For the 2021 season, Lars signed for the Belgian Lotto–Soudal U23 squad, the development team of UCI WorldTeam .

In May, 2019, Lars won the Belgian Junior National Individual Time Trial Championships. In June, 2019, Lars placed 3rd in the Belgian National Road Race for Men's Juniors. The following September, Lars rode for Belgium in the 2019 UCI Road World Championships, held in Yorkshire, England, and placed 28th in the Mens Junior Individual Time Trial.

Major results
2019
 National Junior Road Championships 
1st  Time trial
3rd Road race

References 

2002 births
Belgian male cyclists
Living people
Place of birth missing (living people)